Wayne Lim Junjie, born 27 March 1981, better known by his stage name JJ Lin, is a Singaporean singer, songwriter, record producer and actor. Lin launched his musical career by releasing his debut album Music Voyager (2003).

Early life
Lin's family consists of his brother, father and mother who have a background in Chinese Classical Music, hence influencing the artist's music. Furthermore, his brother was a major influence in his career choice.

Career

In addition to Mandarin, Lin also sings in English, Hokkien (his native dialect) and Cantonese using romanized pronunciation system, and has released his songs in Cantonese. In Taiwan, he was awarded the Best New Artist award at the Golden Melody Awards.

After completing his national service, Lin signed with Ocean Butterflies International, which launched the then 22-year-old Lin's debut album in 2003. In 2011, Lin signed a new contract with the record label Warner Music Taiwan.
 
He is well known for his songwriting and singing skills. He wrote songs for various musical artists while he was still a trainee under Ocean Butterflies under his mentors, Billy Koh and Sunkist Ng. In total, he has written over a hundred songs for other artists. His notable compositions include "Remember" (记得) for Taiwanese singer A-Mei, A-Do's "Let Go" (放手), Harlem Yu's "What's Wrong With You?" (干嘛你看不爽我), Cyndi Wang's "When You" (当你), Vivian Hsu's "Smiling Eyes" (爱笑的眼睛), and Comic Boyz's "Heart of Superman" (超人心).
 
In Singapore, he was selected to perform the remixed version of "Home", the theme song of the National Day Parade in 2004. Lin has sold 1 million copies in less than a week and is extremely successful throughout Asia.
 
In July 2007, he broke a Guinness record by signing 3,052 CDs in 2 hours and 30 minutes. During the signing, he was not allowed to drink or eat. The average time for him to sign a CD was 2.7 seconds.
 
In May 2008, he performed at the CCTV charity event The Giving of Love, dedicated to helping victims of the 2008 Sichuan earthquake. Lin also donated a large sum of money to the rescue efforts and composed a song "Love and Hope" commemorating the tragedy.
 
In February 2008, Lin released a compilation album entitled Waiting for Love. It has selected tracks from several of his albums spanning from his debut album to 2007's West Side. Later in October of that year, his sixth album, Sixology, was released, and it sold 280,000 copies in a week.
 
His own fashion line, SMUDGE, was opened in Singapore during 2008 Christmas with an unofficial launch. The store's official launch was on 13 March 2009.
 
In May 2009, Lin won three awards at the 14th annual Composers and Authors Society of the UK (Compass) Awards Presentations, a ceremony that honors performers in the music scene. It was held at the Royal Albert Hall, Hyde Park, Buckingham Palace and Raffles City Convention Centre, Singapore. He was honored with the Top Local Artiste of the Year award, which is given out to Singaporean artists who generated the highest royalty earnings for the year. In that same year, Lin won the Singapore Youth Award.
 
In 2009, his singing career was put on hold due to his voice being damaged by acid reflux and flu, as well as his hectic touring and recording schedules. His poor health forced him to return to Singapore to recover and receive treatments. He released the seventh album, Hundred Days, on 18 December 2009.
 
In May 2010, Lin performed in America for the first time at the Asian Pacific American Heritage Month Concert Tour (APAHM).
 
In June 2010, Lin performed together with American singer Sean Kingston at the opening concert of the Marina Bay Sands to thousands of invited VIPs guests. But both were absent at the inaugural YOG Opening Ceremony. Lin's eighth album, She Says (她說), was released on 8 December 2010.

Lin's ninth studio album, Lost N Found (学不会) was released on 31 December 2011. A preview of his 9th album was made available on 12 December 2011 on various Chinese internet radio channels.
 
Lin's tenth anniversary album, Stories Untold (因你而在) was released on 13 March 2013. A compilation of micro films were released in conjunction with the album, serving to expand the stories behind the songs. He worked with a few notable people on the album, including Ashin, Harry Chang (张怀秋), and his older brother Eugene Lim (林俊峰). He also started his world tour "Timeline" in July 2013 in Taipei, Taiwan.
 
Lin co-wrote the song "Dreams" with Goh Kheng Long and Corrinne May and performed the song live during the grand finale at the Chingay Parade on 27 and 28 February 2015.
 
One of his recent ventures in the world of music was a duet with Ayumi Hamasaki, for the latter's music video, "The Gift" (and as of 27 April 2015, has about 1,882,459-page views).
 
In 2015, he was selected to perform the National Day Theme Song, "Our Singapore", which was composed by Dick Lee. His experimental debut album From M.E. to Myself was released on 25 December 2015.
 
On 7 July 2016, Lin released "If Miracles had a Sound", a 96-minute music documentary created over the course of 455 days, taking place throughout studios in the U.S., Singapore, Malaysia, Hong Kong, and Taiwan. The theme song of the documentary, "Infinity and Beyond" (超越无限) was released on 21 June 2016.
 
On 19 December 2017, JJ Lin posted on his Instagram page that the past two years "had not been easy" and that he had been "searching constantly for a clear direction", needing a "shelter for the soul, a 'SANCTUARY'". He "penned songs and finished his Message in a Bottle album", which was released on 29 December 2017. At the same time, he and his team and "shared a common vision, starting on project "SANCTUARY" and built the space from ground zero." In early 2018, he announced his "Sanctuary" concert tour began in Shanghai on 17 March. In 2019, he released The Story of Us, and actress Wu Jinyan starred in the music video.

In January 2020, Lin released a song "I'll Stay With You" dedicated to the medical staff in Wuhan, China, who were working hard to save patients infected with COVID-19.

Other work
Lin has appeared in various advertisements for brands such as Sprite, Dota 2, Beats and Cornetto Royale.
 
He is also a tourist ambassador for Singapore. He was also involved in an anti-drugs event as an ambassador, in Taiwan. The theme song for this event is "Baby Baby", which is from his album Westside.
 
On 14 August 2015, Lin was selected to be the advisor for Team Harlem Yu on The Voice of China (season 4).

On 4 November 2016, Lin joined the variety show "Dream Voice" as one of the mentors alongside A-mei Zhang, Jam Hsiao, Hebe Tian, and Yu Quan. He stayed on as a mentor for the second season of the show, which was released in October 2017, and the third season, which was released in October 2018.

In 2017, Lin established Team Still Moving under Gunfire (Team SMG), a professional esports team. Initially focused on Arena of Valor, Team SMG has expanded itself into other games such as PlayerUnknown's Battlegrounds in 2018, Mobile Legends: Bang Bang in 2020 and Dota 2 in 2021.

In 2019, he took part in the Chinese food travelogue show Chef Nic.

On 24 February 2021, Lin performed a medley of songs ("A Whole New World", "Can You Feel the Love Tonight", "Let It Go" and "Embark") to commemorate the official launch of the digital streaming service Disney+ in Singapore, which launched a day earlier on the 23rd.

In July 2022, Lin said he is collaborating with Kiat Lim, son of Singaporean billionaire Peter Lim, and Elroy Cheo, a scion of the Cheo family that owns edible oils firm Mewah International, to co-found ARC, an app-based digital community that authenticates member profiles with non-fungible tokens (NFTs).

Discography

Filmography

Films

Television series

Television shows

Tours 
 Just JJ World Tour (2006–2007)
 I Am World Tour (2010–2011)
 Timeline World Tour (2013–2015)
 Sanctuary World Tour (2018–2021)
 JJ20 World Tour (2022–present)

Awards and nominations

References

External links

 

1981 births
Living people
Hokkien people
Hokkien singers
21st-century Singaporean male actors
21st-century Singaporean male singers
Anglo-Chinese School alumni
MAMA Award winners
Saint Andrew's Junior College alumni
Singaporean Christians
Singaporean Mandopop singers
Singaporean people of Hokkien descent
Singaporean singer-songwriters
Mandopop musicians